Interior may refer to:

Arts and media
 Interior (Degas) (also known as The Rape), painting by Edgar Degas
 Interior (play), 1895 play by Belgian playwright Maurice Maeterlinck
 The Interior (novel), by Lisa See
 Interior design, the trade of designing an architectural interior

Places
 Interior, South Dakota 
 Interior, Washington
 Interior Township, Michigan
 British Columbia Interior, commonly known as "The Interior"

Government agencies
 Interior ministry, sometimes called the ministry of home affairs
 United States Department of the Interior

Other uses
 Interior (topology), mathematical concept that includes, for example, the inside of a shape
 Interior FC, a football team in Gambia

See also 
 
 
 List of geographic interiors
 Interiors (disambiguation)
 Inter (disambiguation)
 Inside (disambiguation)

cs:Interiér
sk:Interiér
sr:Ентеријер
sh:Enterijer